East Leichhardt Dam is a dam built in 1961 on the East Leichhardt River which impounds Lake Mary Kathleen, Queensland. The dam is located 25 km east of Mount Isa, Queensland, and 9 km south of the Barkly Highway.

The dam was built to be an emergency supply of water for the now-closed Mary Kathleen uranium mine. However, Lake Corella was sufficient.

The dam has a capacity of 12,100 megalitres.

See also

List of dams and reservoirs in Australia

References

External links
East Leichardt Dam / Mary Kathleen Information page

Reservoirs in Queensland
North West Queensland
Dams in Queensland